Lavendelstræde (lit. "Lavender Street") is a street in the old town of Copenhagen, Denmark). It runs from Kattesundet-Hestemøllestræde in the northeast to Vester Voldgade in the west, linking Slutterigade and Nytorv and at Regnbuepladsen and Copenhagen City Hall in the southwest.

History
 
The street received its name in 1609. It from the area close to the city's central square Gammeltorv to the Gyldenløve Bastion of the West Rampart which followed present-day Vester Voldgade. The name of the street probably refers to the lavender that grew in a small group of herb gardens located next to the rampart.

The street was completely destroyed in the Copenhagen Fire of 1795. Its buildings were rebuilt over the next few years, and a new combined townhall and courthouse was built at its beginning, fronting Nytorv.

On the Gyldenløve Bastion stood a stub mill, St. Lucy's Windmill (Sankt Lucie Mølle), which was also known as Lavendelstræde Windmill (Lavendelstræde Mølle) after the street. The rampart survived until 1885. The windmill was dismantled and rebuilt at Enghavevej.

Notable buildings

Lavendelstræde No. 1, 4–6 and 10 are listed. No. 1, located at the corner with Hestemøllestræde, dates from  dates from 1806-07. It was expanded with five bays in 1892-93. Constanze Mozart lived in the corner apartment on first floor in the years 1812-1820 with her second husband, the Danish diplomat Georg Nicolaus Nissen. The widow of Wolfgang Amadeus Mozart, she devoted herself to writing a biography of Mozart with the help of Nissen, although it was not finished until 1829.

The street was destroyed in the Copenhagen Fire of 1795. No. 4–6 are from 1799 and No. 10 is from 1796-97. Taphouse (No. 15) is one of the largest beer bars in the city, offering more than 60 different beers on tap, mainly from Danish and foreign microbreweries.

References

External links

 Lavendelstræde at indenforvoldene.dk

Streets in Copenhagen